The ECHL Leading Scorer Award goes to the ECHL player "who leads the league in scoring at the end of the regular season" and has been awarded since 1989. The award is not named after any individual and has three repeat winners as of 2020: Phil Berger won the award in 1991–92 and 1993–94 as a member of the Greensboro Monarchs, John Spoltore won the award in back-to-back years from 1998–99 to 1999–2000 as a member of the Louisiana IceGators, and Chad Costello won in 2014–15, 2015–16, and 2016–17 with the Allen Americans. Twin brothers Tyler and Justin Donati are the only brothers to win the award. Tyler Donati won the award in 2009–10 and Justin Donati won the following season.  Trevor Jobe, the 1992–93 award winner, is the current record holder with 161 points.

Bill McDougall, Stan Drulia, and David Desharnais are the only three winners of this award to advance to the National Hockey League. Scott Gomez, who had played with the Alaska Aces during the 2004–05 NHL lockout, and Ed Courtenay, and Jesse Schultz are the only award winners to have NHL experience before winning the award.

List of ECHL Leading Scorer Award winners

See also 
 ECHL awards

References 

Awards established in 1989
Lead